The 2011–12 Buffalo Sabres season was the 42nd season of operation (41st season of play) for the National Hockey League franchise that was established on May 22, 1970. Their season began October 7, 2011 against the Anaheim Ducks in Helsinki, where the team named Jason Pominville the 13th full-time captain in team history. Pominville filled the vacancy left by Craig Rivet, who was claimed via waivers by the Columbus Blue Jackets during the previous season. As of 2021–22, this represents the most recent season with a points percentage of .500 or better for the Sabres.

Off-season
The Sabres signed several free agents. This was due to the new ownership giving permission to the managing staff to bid for free agents. The previous ownership allowed free agents to leave rather than pay for free agent contracts. The Sabres home also underwent a makeover. The interior of the arena was painted Sabres colors, blue and gold. The players locker rooms also received an extensive multimillion-dollar upgrade. The naming rights were transferred from HSBC to First Niagara Bank and the arena took on the name First Niagara Center.

Regular season
The Sabres participated in the 2011 NHL Premiere, playing their first two regular season games in Europe. After a 2–0 start in Europe, the Sabres returned home and continued to play well. They had a record of 10–5 going into a November 12 game against the Boston Bruins, where, in the first period, Ryan Miller left his crease to play a puck and was hit by the Bruins' Milan Lucic. Miller suffered a concussion and neck injury on the hit and would go on to miss nine games. Lucic was penalized for charging on the play but was not suspended or fined by the League. During the middle part of the season, injuries plagued the team. By the All-Star break the Sabres sat in 14th place in the Eastern Conference and had 225-man-games lost to injury. Jason Pominville was the only Sabre named to the All-Star Game roster. Luke Adam was one of 12 rookies selected to participate in the All-Star Skills Competition.

During the 33 game stretch from the Bruins game (November 12) to January 24, the Sabres had a record of 9–19–5. The poor play included a team record 12-game road losing streak and a run of five consecutive regulation loses on a single road trip.

Things then began to turn around with a shootout win at the New Jersey Devils on January 24, the final game before the All-Star break. The Sabres then went on an 18–5–5 run, going from 14th in the Eastern Conference back into the eighth and final playoff position on March 24 with a 3–1 win at home against the Minnesota Wild. On March 27, the Sabres faced the Washington Capitals for a pivotal game for the final playoff position. The teams entered the game tied at 84 points, with the Capitals holding the tie breaker advantage. The Sabres won the game by a convincing 5–1 score. In the second period of the game, the Sabres were ahead 3–1 and down injuries to two defensemen. Christian Ehrhoff and Andrej Sekera were both injured in the period and the Capitals were going on the power play when Robyn Regehr took a hooking penalty. The penalty left the Sabres with only three available defensemen. On the ensuing power play, Alexander Ovechkin bobbled a pass at the blue line, where Jason Pominville took the puck and scored a short-handed goal to put the Sabres up 4–1. Ryan Miller made 44 saves, improving to a personal record of 8–0–2 in his last ten games and 14–1–3 in 18 games. The win put Buffalo in sole possession of the eighth playoff spot and even in games with Washington.

The Sabres' position in eighth place was short lived, however, due to two consecutive regulation losses, first at home to Pittsburgh and then at Toronto. At home on the back end of the home and home with Toronto, the Sabres fell behind 3–0 in the first period and 5–3 in the third. The Sabres then rallied to score two goals in the final five minutes of the third to tie the game at five. In overtime, Dion Phaneuf took a delay of game penalty, where Derek Roy ended the game on the ensuing power play with his second goal of the game. The win pulled Buffalo even in points with Washington at 88. Washington still held the tie breaker advantage, with each team having two games left to play.

The Sabres would go on to pick up only one point in their final two games, ultimately failing to make the playoffs.

On April 3, 2012, following their final regular season home game, the Sabres announced a new record for average paid attendance of 18,272 per home game.

Playoffs
The Sabres attempted to qualify for the playoffs. The attempt fell three points short and the Sabres finished in ninth place in the Eastern Conference.

Standings

Schedule and results

Pre-season 

|- align="center" bgcolor="#ccffcc"
| 1 || September 19 || Carolina Hurricanes || 1–3 || Buffalo Sabres || ||Enroth || 1–0–0 || 
|- align="center" bgcolor="#ccffcc"
| 2 || September 21 || Buffalo Sabres || 3–1 || Montreal Canadiens || ||Miller || 2–0–0 || 
|- align="center" bgcolor="#ccffcc"
| 3 || September 23 || Buffalo Sabres || 2–1 ||Toronto Maple Leafs || ||Miller || 3–0–0 || 
|- align="center" bgcolor="#ccffcc"
| 4 || September 24 || Toronto Maple Leafs || 2–3 || Buffalo Sabres || || Enroth || 4–0–0 || 
|- align="center" bgcolor="#ffcccc"
| 5 || September 25 || Buffalo Sabres || 1–4 || Columbus Blue Jackets || || Miller || 4–1–0 || 
|- align="center" bgcolor="#ffffff"
| 6 || September 30 || Buffalo Sabres || 4–5 || Washington Capitals || SO || Miller|| 4–1–1 || 
|- align="center" bgcolor="ccffcc"
| 7 || October 4 || Buffalo Sabres || 8–3 || Adler Mannheim || || Enroth || 5–1–1 || 
|-

Regular season

|- align="center" bgcolor="#ccffcc"
| 1 || 7 ||  Anaheim Ducks || 4–1  || Miller || Helsinki, Finland/13,349 || 1–0–0
|- align="center" bgcolor="#ccffcc"
| 2 || 8 || @ Los Angeles Kings || 4–2  || Miller || Berlin, Germany/14,300 || 2–0–0
|- align="center" bgcolor="#ffcccc"
| 3 || 14 || Carolina Hurricanes || 4–3  || Miller || First Niagara Center/18,690 || 2–1–0
|- align="center" bgcolor="#ccffcc"
| 4 || 15 || @ Pittsburgh Penguins || 3–2  || Enroth ||  |Consol Energy Center/18,562 || 3–1–0
|- align="center" bgcolor="#ccffcc"
| 5 || 18 || @ Montreal Canadiens || 3–1   || Miller || Bell Centre/21,273 || 4–1–0
|- align="center" bgcolor="#ccffcc"
| 6 || 20 || @ Florida Panthers || 3–0  || Miller ||  Bank Atlantic Center/14,811 || 5–1–0
|- align="center" bgcolor="#ffcccc"
| 7 || 22 || @ Tampa Bay Lightning || 3–0  || Miller ||  St. Pete Times Forum/19,204 || 5–2–0
|- align="center" bgcolor="#ffcccc"
| 8 || 25 || Tampa Bay Lightning || 4–3  || Miller || First Niagara Center/18,690 || 5–3–0
|- align="center" bgcolor="#ccffcc"
| 9 || 27 ||  Columbus Blue Jackets || 4–2  || Enroth || First Niagara Center/18,690 || 6–3–0
|- align="center" bgcolor="#ffcccc"
| 10 || 29 || Florida Panthers || 3–2  || Miller || First Niagara Center/18,690 || 6–4–0
|-

|- align="center" bgcolor="#ffcccc"
| 11 || 2 ||  Philadelphia Flyers || 3–2  || Miller || First Niagara Center/18,299 || 6–5–0
|- align="center" bgcolor="#ccffcc"
| 12 || 4 ||  Calgary Flames || 2–1  || Enroth || First Niagara Center/18,690 || 7–5–0
|- align="center" bgcolor="#ccffcc"
| 13 || 5 || @ Ottawa Senators || 3–2 (SO)  || Enroth || Scotiabank Place/18,805 || 8–5–0
|- align="center" bgcolor="#ccffcc"
| 14 || 8 || Winnipeg Jets || 6–5 (OT)  || Miller || First Niagara Center/18,690 || 9–5–0
|- align="center" bgcolor="#ccffcc"
| 15 || 11 ||  Ottawa Senators || 5–1  || Enroth || First Niagara Center/18,690 || 10–5–0
|- align="center" bgcolor="#ffcccc"
| 16 || 12 || @ Boston Bruins || 6–2  || Miller || TD Garden/17,565 || 10–6–0
|- align="center" bgcolor="#ccffcc"
| 17 || 14 || @ Montreal Canadiens || 3–2 (SO)  || Enroth || Bell Centre || 11–6–0
|- align="center" bgcolor="#ffcccc"
| 18 || 16 || New Jersey Devils || 5–3  || Enroth || First Niagara Center/18,690 || 11–7–0
|- align="center" bgcolor="#ccffcc"
| 19 || 18 || @ Carolina Hurricanes || 1–0  || Enroth || RBC Center/15,072 || 12–7–0
|- align="center" bgcolor="#ffcccc"
| 20 || 19 ||  Phoenix Coyotes || 4–2  || Enroth || First Niagara Center/18,690 || 12–8–0
|- align="center" bgcolor="#ffffff"
| 21 || 23 || Boston Bruins || 4–3 (SO)  || Enroth || First Niagara Center/18,690 || 12–8–1
|- align="center" bgcolor="#ffcccc"
| 22 || 25 || @ Columbus Blue Jackets || 5–1  || Enroth || Nationwide Arena/16,705  || 12–9–1
|- align="center" bgcolor="#ccffcc"
| 23 || 26 || Washington Capitals || 5–1  || Enroth || First Niagara Center/18,690 || 13–9–1
|- align="center" bgcolor="#ffcccc"
| 24 || 29 || New York Islanders || 2–1  || Enroth || First Niagara Center/18,690 || 13–10–1
|-

|- align="center" bgcolor="#ffcccc"
| 25 || 2 ||  Detroit Red Wings || 4–1  || Enroth || First Niagara Center/18,690 || 13–11–1
|- align="center" bgcolor="#ccffcc"
| 26 || 3 || @ Nashville Predators || 3–2  || Miller || Bridgestone Arena/17,113 || 14–11–1
|- align="center" bgcolor="#ffffff"
| 27 || 7 ||  Philadelphia Flyers || 5–4 (OT)  || Miller || First Niagara Center/18,690 || 14–11–2
|- align="center" bgcolor="#ccffcc"
| 28 || 9 || Florida Panthers || 2–1 (OT)  || Miller || First Niagara Center/18,690 || 15–11–2
|- align="center" bgcolor="#ffcccc"
| 29 || 10 || New York Rangers || 4–1  || Enroth || First Niagara Center/18,690 || 15–12–2
|- align="center" bgcolor="#ffffff"
| 30 || 13 || Ottawa Senators || 3–2 (OT)  || Miller || First Niagara Center/18,690 || 15–12–3
|- align="center" bgcolor="#ccffcc"
| 31 || 16 || Toronto Maple Leafs || 5–4  || Miller || First Niagara Center/18,690 || 16–12–3
|- align="center" bgcolor="#ffcccc"
| 32 || 17 || @ Pittsburgh Penguins || 8–3  || Enroth || |Consol Energy Center/18,584 || 16–13–3
|- align="center" bgcolor="ffcccc"
| 33 || 20 || @ Ottawa Senators || 4–1  || Miller || Scotiabank Place/18,474 || 16–14–3
|- align="center" bgcolor="ffcccc"
| 34 || 22 || @ Toronto Maple Leafs || 3–2  || Miller || Air Canada Centre/19,473 || 16–15–3
|- align="center" bgcolor="#ccffcc"
| 35 || 26 || Washington Capitals || 4–2  || Miller || First Niagara Center/18,690 || 17–15–3
|- align="center" bgcolor="ffcccc"
| 36 || 28 || @ New Jersey Devils || 3–1   || Miller ||  |Prudential Center/17,625 || 17–16–3
|- align="center" bgcolor="ffcccc"
| 37 || 30 || @ Washington Capitals || 3–1  || Miller ||  |Verizon Center/18,506 || 17–17–3
|- align="center" bgcolor="#ffffff"
| 38 || 31 || Ottawa Senators || 3–2 (SO)  || Enroth || First Niagara Center/18,690 || 17–17–4
|-

|- align="center" bgcolor="#ccffcc"
| 39 || 3 ||  Edmonton Oilers || 4–3  || Miller || First Niagara Center/18,690 || 18–17–4
|- align="center" bgcolor="ffcccc"
| 40 || 6 || @ Carolina Hurricanes || 4–2  || Miller ||  RBC Center/16,095|| 18–18–4
|- align="center" bgcolor="#ffffff"
| 41 || 7 ||  Winnipeg Jets || 2–1 (OT)  || Enroth || First Niagara Center/18,690 || 18–18–5
|- align="center" bgcolor="ffcccc"
| 42 || 10 || @ Toronto Maple Leafs || 2–0  || Miller || Air Canada Centre/19,431 || 18–19–5
|- align="center" bgcolor="#ccffcc"
| 43 || 13 || Toronto Maple Leafs || 3–2  || Miller || First Niagara Center/18,690 || 19–19–5
|- align="center" bgcolor="#ffcccc"
| 44 || 14 || @ New York Islanders || 4–2  || Enroth  || Nassau Veterans Memorial Coliseum/13,848 || 19–20–5
|- align="center" bgcolor="#ffcccc"
| 45 || 16 || @ Detroit Red Wings || 5–0  || Miller || Joe Louis Arena/20,066 || 19–21–5
|- align="center" bgcolor="#ffcccc"
| 46 || 18 || @ Chicago Blackhawks || 6–2  || Enroth || United Center/21,114 || 19–22–5
|- align="center" bgcolor="#ffcccc"
| 47 || 19 || @ Winnipeg Jets || 4–1  || Miller ||  MTS Centre/15,004 || 19–23–5
|- align="center" bgcolor="#ffcccc"
| 48 || 21 || @ St. Louis Blues || 4–2  || Miller ||  Scottrade Center/19,150 || 19–24–5
|- align="center" bgcolor="#ccffcc"
| 49 || 24 || @ New Jersey Devils || 2–1 (SO)  || Miller ||  Prudential Center/13,735 || 20–24–5
|- align="center" bgcolor="#ccffcc"
| 50 || 31 || @ Montreal Canadiens || 3–1  || Miller || Bell Centre/21,273 || 21–24–5
|-

|- align="center" bgcolor="#ffffff"
| 51 || 1 || New York Rangers || 1–0 (SO)  || Miller || First Niagara Center/18,690 ||  21–24–6
|- align="center" bgcolor="#ccffcc"
| 52 || 4 || @ New York Islanders || 4–3 (SO)  || Miller || Nassau Veterans Memorial Coliseum/14,618 || 22–24–6
|- align="center" bgcolor="#ccffcc"
| 53 || 8 ||  Boston Bruins || 6–0  || Miller  || First Niagara Center/18,690 || 23–24–6
|- align="center" bgcolor="#ccffcc"
| 54 || 10 || Dallas Stars || 3–2 (SO)  || Miller || First Niagara Center/18,690 || 24–24–6
|- align="center" bgcolor="#ffcccc"
| 55 || 11 ||  Tampa Bay Lightning || 2–1  || Miller || First Niagara Center/18,690 || 24–25–6
|- align="center"  bgcolor="#ffcccc"
| 56 || 14 || New Jersey Devils || 4–1  || Miller || First Niagara Center/18,690 || 24–26–6
|- align="center" bgcolor="#ffcccc"
| 57 || 16 || @ Philadelphia Flyers || 7–2  || Enroth || Wells Fargo Center/19,725 || 24–27–6
|- align="center"
| 58 || 17 || Montreal Canadiens || 4–3 (SO)  || Miller || First Niagara Center/18,690 || 24–27–7
|- align="center" bgcolor="#ccffcc"
| 59 || 19 || Pittsburgh Penguins || 6–2  || Miller || First Niagara Center/18,690 || 25–27–7
|- align="center" bgcolor="#ccffcc"
| 60 || 21 || New York Islanders || 2–1  || Miller  ||  First Niagara Center/18,690 || 26–27–7
|- align="center" bgcolor="#ccffcc"
| 61 || 24 || Boston Bruins || 2–1 (SO)  || Miller  || First Niagara Center/18,690 || 27–27–7
|- align="center"
| 62 || 25 || @ New York Rangers || 3–2 (OT)  || Miller || Madison Square Garden/18,200 || 27–27–8
|- align="center" bgcolor="#ccffcc"
| 63 || 29 || @ Anaheim Ducks || 2–0  || Miller || Honda Center/14,972 || 28–27–8
|-

|- align="center" bgcolor="#ccffcc"
| 64 || 1 || @ San Jose Sharks || 1–0  || Miller || HP Pavilion/17,562 || 29–27–8
|- align="center" bgcolor="#ccffcc"
| 65 || 3 || @ Vancouver Canucks || 5–3  || Miller  || Rogers Arena/18,890 || 30–27–8
|- align="center" bgcolor="#ffcccc"
| 66 || 5 || @ Winnipeg Jets || 1–3  || Miller || MTS Centre/15,004 || 30–28–8
|- align="center" bgcolor="#ccffcc"
| 67 || 7 ||  Carolina Hurricanes || 3–2 (OT)  || Miller || First Niagara Center/18,690 || 31–28–8
|- align="center" bgcolor="#ffcccc"
| 68 || 8 || @ Boston Bruins || 3–1  || Enroth  || TD Garden/17,565 || 31–29–8
|- align="center" bgcolor="#ccffcc"
| 69 || 10 || @ Ottawa Senators || 4–3 (SO)  ||Miller || Scotiabank Place/19,951 || 32–29–8
|- align="center" bgcolor="#ccffcc"
| 70 || 12 || Montreal Canadiens || 3–2 (OT)  || Miller || First Niagara Center/18,690 || 33–29–8
|- align="center"
| 71 || 14 || Colorado Avalanche || 5–4 (SO)  || Miller || First Niagara Center/18,690 || 33–29–9
|- align="center"
| 72 || 17 || @ Florida Panthers || 3–2 (SO)  || Miller || BankAtlantic Center/16,827 || 33–29–10
|- align="center" bgcolor="#ccffcc"
| 73 || 19 || @ Tampa Bay Lightning || 7–3  || Miller || St. Pete Times Forum/17,212 || 34–29–10
|- align="center" bgcolor="#ccffcc"
| 74 || 21 || Montreal Canadiens || 3–0  || Miller || First Niagara Center/18,690 || 35–29–10
|- align="center" bgcolor="#ccffcc"
| 75 || 23 || @ New York Rangers || 4–1  || Miller || Madison Square Garden/18,200 || 36–29–10
|- align="center" bgcolor="#ccffcc"
| 76 || 24 ||  Minnesota Wild || 3–1  || Miller || First Niagara Center/18,690 || 37–29–10
|- align="center" bgcolor="#ccffcc"
| 77 || 27 || @ Washington Capitals || 5–1  || Miller ||  |Verizon Center/18,506|| 38–29–10
|- align="center" bgcolor="#ffcccc"
| 78 || 30 ||  Pittsburgh Penguins || 3–5  || Miller || First Niagara Center/18,690 || 38–30–10
|- align="center" bgcolor="#ffcccc"
| 79 || 31 || @ Toronto Maple Leafs || 3–4  || Miller ||  |Air Canada Centre/19,446 || 38–31–10
|-

|- align="center" bgcolor="#ccffcc"
| 80 || 3 || Toronto Maple Leafs || 6–5 OT  || Miller || First Niagara Center/18,690 || 39–31–10
|- align="center" bgcolor="ffcccc"
| 81 || 5 || @ Philadelphia Flyers || 1–2  || Miller || Wells Fargo Center/19,873 || 39–32–10
|- align="center"
| 82 || 7 || @ Boston Bruins || 3–4 SO  || Enroth || TD Garden/17,565 || 39–32–11
|-

|-
| 2011–2012 Schedule

Player statistics

Skaters

Goaltenders

†Denotes player spent time with another team before joining Sabres. Stats reflect time with Sabres only.
‡Traded mid-season. Stats reflect time with Sabres only.

Awards and records

Awards

Records 
On October 25, 2011, Brad Boyes played in his 500th consecutive NHL game, becoming the 20th player in NHL history to reach that mark. This streak ended at 513 when he was injured in the November 23 game.

Milestones

Transactions 
The Sabres have been involved in the following transactions during the 2011–12 season:

Trades

Free agents signed

Free agents lost

Claimed via waivers

Lost via waivers

Lost via retirement

Player signings

Draft picks 
Buffalo's picks at the 2011 NHL Entry Draft.

See also 
 2011–12 NHL season

References

Buffalo Sabres seasons
Buffalo Sabres
Buffalo Sabres
Buffalo
Buffalo